George Francis "Gabby" Hayes (7 May 1885 – 9 February 1969) was an American actor. He began as something of a leading man and a character player, but he was best known for his numerous appearances in B-Western film series as the bewhiskered, cantankerous, but ever-loyal and brave comic sidekick of the cowboy stars Hopalong Cassidy and Roy Rogers.

Early years
Hayes was born the third of seven children in his father's hotel, the Hayes Hotel, in Stannards, New York, a hamlet just outside Wellsville, New York. (Hayes always gave Wellsville as his birthplace, but legally he was born in Stannards.) He was the son of Elizabeth Morrison and Clark Hayes. His father, in addition to operating the Hayes Hotel, was also involved in oil production. His siblings included his brothers, William W., Morrison, and Clark B., and his sisters, Nellie Elizabeth Hayes Ebeling and Harriet "Hattie" Elizabeth Hayes Allen. Morrison Hayes, a corporal in the United States Army, was killed in action on July 19, 1918, during World War I in France and was awarded the Distinguished Service Cross for his actions during the war. The American Legion post in Wellsville is named after Morrison Hayes His uncle on his mother's side was George F. Morrison, vice president of General Electric. 

George Hayes grew up in Stannards and attended Stannards School. He played semi-professional baseball while in high school. He ran away from home in 1902, at 17, joined a stock company, apparently traveled for a time with a circus, and became a successful vaudevillian.

Hayes married Olive E. Ireland, the daughter of a New Jersey glass finisher, on March 4, 1914. She joined him in vaudeville, performing under the name Dorothy Earle (not to be confused with film actress and writer Dorothy Earle). Hayes had become so successful that by 1928, at age 43, he was able to retire to a home on Long Island in Baldwin, New York. He lost all his savings the next year in the 1929 stock market crash. Olive persuaded her husband to try his luck in films, and the couple moved to Los Angeles. They remained together until her death on July 5, 1957. The couple had no children.

Film career

After his move to Los Angeles, according to later interviews, Hayes had a chance meeting with the producer Trem Carr (originally Tremlet C. Carr), who liked his look and gave him 30 roles over the next six years. In his early career, Hayes was cast in a variety of roles, including villains, and occasionally played two roles in a single film. He found a niche in the growing genre of Western films, many of which were series with recurring characters. Hayes did not come from a cowboy background; he did not know how to ride a horse until he was in his forties and had to learn film roles.

Hayes, in real life an intelligent, well-groomed and articulate man, was often cast as a grizzled codger who uttered phrases such as "consarn it", "yer durn tootin'", "dadgummit", "durn persnickety female", and "young whippersnapper". From 1935 to 1939, Hayes played the part of Windy Halliday, the humorous "codger" sidekick of Hopalong Cassidy (played by William Boyd). In 1939, Hayes left that role at Paramount Pictures after a dispute over his salary and moved to Republic Pictures. Since Paramount held the rights to the name Windy Halliday, they renamed him Gabby Whitaker, in virtually the same role. As Gabby, he appeared in more than 40 films between 1939 and 1946, usually with Roy Rogers (44 times), but also with Gene Autry (7) and Wild Bill Elliott (14), often working under the directorship of Joseph Kane (34). Hayes was also repeatedly cast as a sidekick of the Western stars Randolph Scott (six times) and John Wayne (fifteen times, some as straight or villainous characters). Hayes played Wayne's sidekick in Raoul Walsh's Dark Command (1940), which featured Roy Rogers in a supporting role.

Hayes became a popular performer and consistently appeared among the 10 favorite actors in polls taken of moviegoers of the period. He appeared in either one or both the Motion Picture Herald and Boxoffice Magazine lists of the Top Ten Moneymaking Western Stars for twelve straight years and a thirteenth time in 1954, four years after his last film.

Westerns declined in popularity in the late 1940s, and Hayes made his last film in the genre in 1950: The Cariboo Trail. He moved to television and hosted The Gabby Hayes Show, a Western series, from 1950 to 1954 on NBC and, in a new version in 1956, on ABC. The show was sponsored by Quaker Oats, whose products were prominently advertised during the show. Gabby would promote the puffed wheat product by saying to stand back from the screen and firing a cannon loaded with cereal at the screen as a tie in to their ad slogan: "shot from guns". He introduced the show, often while whittling on a piece of wood, and would sometimes throw in a tall tale. Halfway through the show, he would say something else, and at the end of the show, also, but he did not appear as an active character in the stories. When the series ended, Hayes retired from show business. During this time, he made guest appearances on television, including several on Howdy Doody for his friend "Buffalo" Bob Smith. He lent his name to a comic book series, "Gabby Hayes Western" comics, published by Fawcett Publications from November 1948 until January 1957, and to a children's summer camp in New York.

Death

Following his wife's death on July 5, 1957, Hayes lived in and managed a 10-unit apartment building he owned in North Hollywood, California.

Early in 1969 he entered Saint Joseph Hospital in Burbank, California, for treatment of cardiovascular disease. Hayes died there on February 9, 1969, at the age of 83. He is interred in the Forest Lawn–Hollywood Hills Cemetery in Los Angeles.

Honors

Two stars on the Hollywood Walk of Fame commemorate Hayes's work in the entertainment industry: one for his contribution to radio, at 6427 Hollywood Boulevard, and one for his contribution to television, at 1724 Vine Street. In 2000, he was posthumously inducted into the Western Performers Hall of Fame at the National Cowboy and Western Heritage Museum in Oklahoma City, Oklahoma.

Popular culture

Homage was paid to Hayes in a different way in the 1974 satirical Western Blazing Saddles. The actor and director Jack Starrett, credited as Claude Ennis Starrett, Jr., played a Hayes-like character. In keeping with a running joke in the movie, the character is called Gabby Johnson. After Johnson delivers a rousing, though partially unintelligible speech to the townspeople, David Huddleston's character stands up to say, "Now, who can argue with that?!", and proclaims it "authentic frontier gibberish".

In the animated film Toy Story 2, the character Stinky Pete the Prospector, voiced by Kelsey Grammer, is modeled after Hayes. In the film's fictional universe, he is a toy version of a character on the marionette television western Woody's Roundup, where he is a colorful comic relief character. In contrast, the toy is intelligent and well-spoken, a reference to Hayes's contrasting real-life and film personas.

Into a Mighty Carson Art Players sketch on The Tonight Show, Johnny Carson impersonated Gabby Hayes in a sketch with Roy Rogers. This sketch has appeared on Carson's syndicated series Carson's Comedy Classics, which features highlights from his years as The Tonight Show host.

Hayes was mentioned in The Simpsons episode "Radioactive Man", in which Milhouse becomes Radioactive Man's sidekick, Fallout Boy; the director of the film comments that Milhouse is "going to be big, Gabby Hayes big!"

Every year in early July, from 1983 through 1989, "Gabby Hayes Days" were celebrated in Wellsville, New York. The event featured a street sale, square dancing, and Hayes look-alike contests for adults and children. This celebration was eventually merged in the mid-July Wellsville Balloon Rally and gradually disappeared. A street is also named after him in Wellsville, Gabby Hayes Lane.

Since April 1969, a band of fishermen has traveled to Kettle Creek, Potter County, Pennsylvania, for the "Gabby Hayes Memorial Trout Fishing Tournament". These men, known as Gabby Guys, gather annually to celebrate the opening day of the trout fishing season and the memory of Hayes. On April 2019, they celebrated their fiftieth anniversary, which also marked 50 years since Hayes' passing.

Partial filmography

 The Rainbow Man (1929) as Bill (debut)
 Big News (1929) as Hoffman - Reporter
 Smiling Irish Eyes (1929) as Taxi Driver
 Top Speed (1930) as Western Union Clerk (uncredited)
 For the Defense (1930) as Ben - Waiter (uncredited)
 Playing Around (1930) as Railroad Ticket Seller (uncredited)
 She Who Gets Slapped (1930) as Poker Player (uncredited), short film
 Cavalier of the West (1931) as Sheriff Bill Ryan
 Freighters of Destiny (1931) as Jim
 Oklahoma Jim (1931) as Crooked Gambler (uncredited)
 The Nevada Buckaroo (1931) as Cherokee Williams
 Pleasure (1931) as Motorcycle Cop
 Big Business Girl (1931) as Hotel Clerk (uncredited)
 God's Country and the Man (1931) as Stingaree Kelly
 Dirigible (1931) as Parade Official (uncredited)
 The Stolen Jools (1931) as Projectionist (as George Hayes)
 Dragnet Patrol (1931) as Private Detective
 Play Girl (1932) as Dance Hall Tobacconist (uncredited)
 Love Me Tonight (1932) as Grocer (uncredited)
 Winner Take All (1932) as Intern at Rosario Ranch
 Ghost Valley (1932) as Dave (uncredited)
 The Man from Hell's Edges (1932) as Shamrock Cassidy
 The Boiling Point (1932) as George Duncan
 Riders of the Desert (1932) as Hashknife Brooks
 Border Devils (1932) as Dude Sanders
 Wild Horse Mesa (1932) as Slack
 Sally of the Subway (1932) as Police Lieutenant Paxton (uncredited)
 Texas Buddies (1932) as Si Haller
 Hidden Valley (1932) as Henchman Gavin - Black Hat
 Broadway to Cheyenne (1932) as Walrus
 Klondike (1932) as Tom Ross
 The Night Rider (1932) as Altoonie
 The Fighting Champ (1932) as Pete
 Crashin' Broadway (1932) as J. Talbot Thorndyke
 Self Defense (1932) as Jury Foreman
 Ship of Wanted Men (1933) as Crewman
 Ranger's Code (1933) as Baxter
 Skyway (1933) as George Taylor
 Galloping Romeo (1933) as Grizzly
 The Fugitive (1933) as Judge Taylor
 Fighting Texans (1933) as Pop Martin
 The Sphinx (1933) as Det. Casey
 Breed of the Border (1933) as Chuck Wiggins
 Devil's Mate (1933) as Collins
 Riders of Destiny (1933) as Charlie Denton (The first of a series of John Wayne Lone Star Westerns)
 The Gallant Fool (1933) as Dad Denton
 The Return of Casey Jones (1933) as Timothy Shine
 Trailing North (1933) as Flash Ryan
 The Phantom Broadcast (1933) as Police Lieutenant
 The Brand of Hate (1934) as Bill Larkins
 Monte Carlo Nights (1934) as Inspector Nick Gunby
 The Lucky Texan (1934) as Jake Benson
 West of the Divide (1934) as Dusty
 Blue Steel (1934) as Sheriff Jake Withers
 Randy Rides Alone (1934) as Marvin Black aka Matt the Mute
 The Star Packer (1934) as Matt Matlock
 The Lawless Frontier (1934) as Dusty
 The Man from Utah (1934) as Marshal George Higgins
 'Neath the Arizona Skies (1934) as Matt Downing (uncredited)
 In Old Santa Fe (1934) as Cactus (Gene Autry's screen debut)
 The Man from Hell (1934) as Col. Campbell - Banker
 City Limits (1934) as Charlie Carter
 House of Mystery (1934) as David Fells
 The Lost Jungle (1934) as Doctor - Dirigible Passenger
 Mystery Liner (1934) as Joe, the Watchman
 Beggars in Ermine (1934) as Joe Wilson
 The Lost City (1935) as Butterfield
 Texas Terror (1935) as Sheriff Ed Williams
 Rainbow Valley (1935) as George Hole
 Smokey Smith (1935) as Blaze Bart
 Tombstone Terror (1935) as Soupy Baxter
 The Headline Woman (1935) as Police Desk Sgt. Duffy
 Hitch Hike Lady (1935) as Miner
 Swifty (1935) as Sheriff Dan Hughes
 Bar 20 Rides Again (1935) as Windy
 The Eagle's Brood (1935) as Bartender Spike
 1000 Dollars a Minute (1935) as "New Deal" Watson
 The Throwback (1935) as Ford Cruze
 Thunder Mountain (1935) as Foley
 Tumbling Tumbleweeds (1935) as Dr. Parker
 Welcome Home (1935) as Charles Rogers (uncredited)
 The Farmer Takes a Wife (1935) as Lucas (uncredited)
 Hop-Along Cassidy (1935) as Uncle Ben
 Honeymoon Limited (1935) as Jasper Pinkham
 Ladies Crave Excitement (1935) as Dan McCloskey
 Justice of the Range (1935) as John Coffin known as Pegleg Sanderson
 The Hoosier Schoolmaster (1935) as Pearson
 The Outlaw Tamer (1935) as Cactus Barnes
 Death Flies East (1935) as Wotkyns
 The Lawless Nineties (1936) as Major Carter
 Mr. Deeds Goes to Town (1936) as Farmer's Spokesman (uncredited)
 The Texas Rangers (1936) as Judge Snow
 Valiant Is the Word for Carrie (1936) as Bearded Man
 Hopalong Cassidy Returns (1936) as Windy Halliday
 The Plainsman (1936) as Breezy
 Trail Dust (1936) as Windy
 Hearts in Bondage (1936) as Ezra
 I Married a Doctor (1936) as Train Station Agent
 Three on the Trail (1936) as Windy Halliday
 Song of the Trail (1936) as Dan Hobson
 Call of the Prairie (1936) as Shanghai
 Heart of the West (1936) as Windy
 Silver Spurs (1936) as Drag Harlan
 Valley of the Lawless (1936) as Grandpaw Jenkins
 Borderland (1937) as Windy Halliday
 Rustlers' Valley (1937) as Windy Halliday
 Texas Trail (1937) as Windy Halliday
 North of the Rio Grande (1937) as Windy Halliday
 Mountain Music (1937) as Grandpappy Burnside
 Hills of Old Wyoming (1937) as Windy Halliday
 Hopalong Rides Again (1937) as Windy Halliday
 Heart of Arizona (1938) as Windy Halliday
 Bar 20 Justice (1938) as Windy Halliday
 In Old Mexico (1938) as Windy Halliday
 Pride of the West (1938) as Windy Halliday
 The Frontiersmen (1938) as Windy Halliday
 Sunset Trail (1938) as Windy Halliday
 Gold Is Where You Find It (1938) as Enoch
 Silver on the Sage (1939) as Windy Halliday
 Renegade Trail (1939) as Windy Halliday
 Days of Jesse James (1939) as Gabby Whittaker
 Let Freedom Ring (1939) as 'Pop" Wilkie
 Saga of Death Valley (1939) as Gabby Whittaker
 The Arizona Kid (1939) as Gabby Whittaker
 In Old Monterey (1939) as Gabby Whittaker
 Wall Street Cowboy (1939) as Gabby Whittaker
 In Old Caliente (1939) as Gabby Whittaker
 Man of Conquest (1939) as Lannie Upchurch
 Southward Ho (1939) as Gabby Whittaker
 Fighting Thoroughbreds (1939) as 'Gramps' Montrose
 Dark Command (1940) as Doc Grunch
 Wagons Westward (1940) as Hardtack
 The Carson City Kid (1940) as Marshal Gabby Whittaker
 The Border Legion (1940) as Honest John Whittaker
 Melody Ranch (1940) as Pop Laramie
 Young Bill Hickok (1940) as Gabby Whittaker
 Colorado (1940) as Gabby
 The Ranger and the Lady (1940) as Texas Ranger Sergeant Gabby Whittaker
 Young Buffalo Bill (1940) as Gabby Whittaker
 Robin Hood of the Pecos (1941) as Gabriel "Gabby" Hornaday
 Sheriff of Tombstone (1941) as Judge Gabby Whittaker
 Red River Valley (1941) as Gabby Whittaker
 Jesse James at Bay (1941) as Sheriff Gabby Whittaker
 Bad Man of Deadwood (1941) as Professor Mortimer 'Gabby' Blackstone
 Nevada City (1941) as Gabby Chapman
 In Old Cheyenne (1941) as Arapahoe Brown
 Man from Cheyenne (1942) as Gabby Whittaker
 Romance on the Range (1942) as Gabby
 Sons of the Pioneers (1942) as Gabby Whittaker
 Ridin' Down the Canyon (1942) as Gabby
 Heart of the Golden West (1942) as Gabby
 Sunset Serenade (1942) as Gabby
 Sunset on the Desert (1942) as Gabby Whittaker
 South of Santa Fe (1942) as Gabby Whittaker
 Calling Wild Bill Elliott (1943) as Gabby Whittaker
 In Old Oklahoma (1943) as Despirit Dean
 Death Valley Manhunt (1943) as Gabby Hayes
 Overland Mail Robbery (1943) as Gabby
 Wagon Tracks West (1943) as Gabby
 Bordertown Gun Fighters (1943) as Gabby Hayes
 The Man from Thunder River (1943) as Gabby Whittaker
 Mojave Firebrand (1944) as Gabby Hayes
 Hidden Valley Outlaws (1944) as Gabby Hayes
 Tall in the Saddle (1944) as Dave
 The Big Bonanza (1944) as Hap Selby
 Tucson Raiders (1944) as Gabby Hopkins
 Lights of Old Santa Fe as Gabby Whittaker
 Marshal of Reno (1944) as Gabby
 Sunset in El Dorado (1945) as Gabby
 The Man from Oklahoma (1945) as Gabby Whittaker
 Bells of Rosarita (1945) as Gabby Whittaker
 Utah (1945) as Gabby Whittaker
 Don't Fence Me In (1945) as Gabby Whittaker aka Wildcat Kelly
 Along the Navajo Trail (1945) as Gabby Whittaker
 My Pal Trigger (1946) as Gabby Kendrick
 Heldorado (1946) as Gabby
 Home in Oklahoma (1946) as Gabby Whittaker
 Roll on Texas Moon (1946) as Gabby Whittaker
 Under Nevada Skies (1946) as Gabby Whittaker
 Rainbow Over Texas (1946) as Sheriff Gabby Whittaker
 Badman's Territory (1946) as Coyote
 Song of Arizona (1946) as Coyote
 Wyoming (1947) as Windy Gibson
 Trail Street (1947) as Billy
 Albuquerque (1948) as Juke
 Return of the Bad Men (1948) as John Petit
 The Untamed Breed (1948) as Windy Lucas
 El Paso (1949) as Pasky (Pescaloosa) Tees
 The Cariboo Trail (1950) as Oscar aka Grizzly

Comic book appearances
 Gabby Hayes Adventure Comics #1 (1953, Toby Press)
 Gabby Hayes Western #1–59 (1948–1957, Fawcett Publications)
 Gabby Hayes Western #50–111 (1951–1955, L. Miller black-and-white reprints of Fawcett Comics)
 Gabby Hayes Mini Comics, 5 issues (1951, Quaker Oats giveaway)

References

External links

Amctv.com article on Hayes and other Western sidekicks

1885 births
1969 deaths
Male actors from New York (state)
American male film actors
American male radio actors
American male television actors
Burials at Forest Lawn Memorial Park (Hollywood Hills)
People from Allegany County, New York
RCA Victor artists
Vaudeville performers
Male Western (genre) film actors
20th-century American male actors
Western (genre) television actors